Hilli may refer to:
 "Hilli" (At the Top of the World), a song from the album Kurr by Icelandic band Amiina

 Battle of Hilli, a battle in the 1971 Indo-Pakistani War

People
 Allamah Al-Hilli (1250–1325), Twelver Shi'a theologian and mujtahid
 Arvo Hilli (born 1930), Finnish hurdler
 Johanna Hilli (born 1994), Finnish handball player for HIFK Handboll and the Finnish national team
 Mariam Mohamed Hadi Al Hilli (born 1984), Bahraini Olympic athlete
 Muhaqqiq al-Hilli (c. 1205–1277), Islamic scholar
 Sebastian Hilli (born 1990), Finnish composer

See also 
 T. hilli (disambiguation)
 O. hilli (disambiguation)
 Hillis, a given name and surname